Maxim Antoniuc (born 15 January 1991) is a Moldovan footballer who plays for Moldovan National Division club Milsami Orhei. He previously played for Zimbru Chișinău and Iskra-Stal Rîbniţa, among others.

He is the brother of Moldova international footballer Alexandru Antoniuc

References

External links

1991 births
Living people
Moldovan footballers
Moldova international footballers
Association football forwards
Moldovan Super Liga players
Uzbekistan Super League players
FC Zimbru Chișinău players
FC Iskra-Stal players
FC Veris Chișinău players
FC Sheriff Tiraspol players
FC Academia Chișinău players
PFK Nurafshon players
CS Petrocub Hîncești players
FC Milsami Orhei players
Moldovan expatriate footballers
Expatriate footballers in Uzbekistan
Moldovan expatriate sportspeople in Uzbekistan
Moldova under-21 international footballers
Moldova youth international footballers